The Women's 100 metre breaststroke competition at the 2019 World Championships was held on 22 and 23 July 2019.

Records
Prior to the competition, the existing world and championship records were as follows.

Results

Heats
The heats were held on 22 July at 10:38.

Semifinals
The semifinals were held on 22 July at 20:29.

Semifinal 1

Semifinal 2

Swim-off
The swim-off was held on 22 July at 21:31.

Final
The final was held on 23 July at 21:47.

References

Women's 100 metre breaststroke
2019 in women's swimming